Jørgen Dobloug (23 April 1945 – 16 January 2018) was a Norwegian artist based in  Düsseldorf and Oslo.

He studied at the Staatliche Kunstakademie Düsseldorff (1971 – 78), Klasse Professor Joseph Beuys. Dobloug is an important Norwegian artist, who left Norway and what be believed to be a rigid educational system for performing arts, to find his own way. Dobloug’s works have been shown in a large number of exhibitions, in Norway and abroad.

His works are mainly acrylic paintings displaying either abstract motifs or heads/faces. They are humorous, partly with contradictory elements in respect of both motif, composition and colours. The works span from strict geometric paintings including grid-patterns, to playful paintings executed with a rough, almost expressive, brush. There is furthermore conceptual side to Dobloug’s project. Still, this is not the dominant feature of his works.

Dobloug was granted the Norwegian Government Grant for Artists from 1995.

References

Bibliography 
 Norsk kunstnerleksikon Bind 1 A-G p. 492, Universitetsforlaget 1982. 
 "Brennpunkt Düsseldorf 1962-1987", Kunstmuseum Düsseldorf 1987. Utstillingskatalog
 Øysten Ustvedt: Ny norsk kunst etter 1990 p. 75-77, Faktabokforlaget 2001. 
 Johannes Rød og Arnt Fredheim: Malerier p. 217, Gyldendal Norsk Forlag 2004.

External links
 Norsk Kunstnerleksikon
 Kunstnerforbundet
 Vestfossen Kunstlaboratorium

1945 births
2018 deaths
Norwegian expatriates in Germany
20th-century Norwegian painters
21st-century Norwegian painters
Norwegian male painters
20th-century Norwegian male artists
21st-century Norwegian male artists
Artists from Oslo